Aspiration is a sustainability-as-a-service company with global operations based in Los Angeles, California.

History
Aspiration was founded in 2013 by Andrei Cherny and Joseph Sanberg. It opened for business in February 2015.

As of May 2020, Aspiration had raised over $250 million in funding.

In August 2021, Aspiration announced that it would be going public on the New York Stock Exchange by merging with the special-purpose acquisition company (SPAC) InterPrivate III Financial Partners in a $2.3 billion merger. The deal is expected to close in the fourth quarter of 2021. Ahead of the merger, Oaktree Capital Management and investment affiliates of billionaire Steve Ballmer committed $315 million in additional financing to Aspiration.

In October 2022, Olivia Albrecht succeeded Andrei Cherny as CEO of Aspiration.

Products
In April 2017, the company launched a feature on its mobile app called Aspiration Impact Measurement (AIM), which examines 75,000 data points and shows scores for companies where Aspiration customers shop, based on how those companies treat people and the planet. Each Aspiration customer is also given a personal AIM score based on their purchasing behavior.

In November 2015, the company launched the Aspiration Redwood Fund. Aspiration says the mutual fund does not invest in companies involved in the alcohol, tobacco, arms and military, nuclear power, gambling, pornography, and oil and gas industries. However, the fund owns shares in several companies that heavily use fossil fuels. Almost 3% of the fund's holdings are in Southwest Airlines's stocks, which has emitted 12.6 million tons of greenhouse gases in 2020; in contrast, only 2.3% of the fund's holdings are in sustainable energy stocks. The fund also owns shares of MSA Safety, a company making safety products for the military and fossil fuel industry.

The company allows its customers to name their own checking and investing fees through its “Pay What Is Fair” initiative.

Aspiration launched a feature called “Plant Your Change” in April of 2020 that allows customers to round up any transaction to the nearest dollar to plant one tree. By April of the following year, Aspiration customers collectively planted over 10 million trees.

Launched in March 2021, the Aspiration Zero credit card offers cash-back rewards and allows cardholders to offset their carbon footprint by turning every purchase into a newly planted tree.

Recognition
 2015: Money magazine's Best Checking Account
 2016: Fast Companys Most Innovative Companies
 2017: Inc magazine's Most Disruptive Companies of the Year
 2021: Money Under 30’s Best Socially Conscious Company

References

External links
 

Financial services companies established in 2013
Financial services companies of the United States
Financial services companies based in California
Companies established in 2013
Marina del Rey, California
2013 establishments in the United States
2013 establishments in California